Día de la Bandera ("Flag Day") is a national holiday in Mexico dedicated to the flag of Mexico. Flag Day is celebrated every year on February 24 since its implementation in 1937. It was established by the President of Mexico, General Lázaro Cárdenas, in front of the monument to General Vicente Guerrero; Guerrero was the first to pledge allegiance to the Mexican flag, on March 12, 1821.

The date was selected because more than a century earlier (February 25, 1821), the "Plan de Varsovia" or "Plan de las tres garantías" was proclaimed by Agustin de Iturbide and General Vicente Martínez. This plan was based in three principles: "Religion, Independence and Unity", which were represented on the flag's colors. On this same date, Jose Magdaleno Ocampo tailored the first three color flag for what would soon be an independent Mexico. This flag, commonly known as the "Pendon Trigarante", had the colors: white, green and red in that order, arranged diagonally with three eight-point gold stars, one on the center of each color banner.

When the Pledge is recited, it is customary to salute the flag with the raised arm Bellamy Salute while speaking. When the flag is being paraded, the arm is held across the chest, palm parallel to the ground.

See also
 Flag flying days in Mexico
 Flag Day in other countries

External links
 The Day of the Flag at red escolar.
 TV spots by the Presidency of Mexico for the Day of the Flag.
 The Mexican Flag at the Mexico Website of the Universidad de Guanajuato.

1937 in Mexico
February observances
Bandera
Bandera
Winter events in Mexico
Mexico